Jung Hoyeon (born June 23, 1994), also known as Hoyeon Jung, is a South Korean model and actress. She began her career as a freelance model in 2010, walking in Seoul Fashion Week shows for two years. In 2013, she competed on the fourth season of Korea's Next Top Model and placed as a runner-up. She became known for her "fiery" red hair after making her international runway debut during New York Fashion Week. She was a Louis Vuitton exclusive in 2016, and became a global ambassador for the brand in 2021. 

Jung made her acting debut in 2021, starring in the Netflix series Squid Game as Kang Sae-byeok, which brought her worldwide attention and critical acclaim as the series' breakout star. For her role on the series, she won the Screen Actors Guild Award for Outstanding Performance by a Female Actor in a Drama Series and earned a nomination for the Primetime Emmy Award for Outstanding Supporting Actress in a Drama Series.

Early life
Jung Hoyeon was born on June 23, 1994, in Myeonmok-dong, Seoul, South Korea, and has two sisters. Her parents are restaurateurs. She graduated from Dongduk Women's University College of Performing Arts, where she majored in modeling.

Career

Modeling
Jung started taking modeling classes at age 15, and began working as a freelance model in 2010 at age 16, walking in shows for Seoul Fashion Week without an agency for two years. While freelancing, she auditioned for the second season of the OnStyle reality competition series Korea's Next Top Model in 2011, but quit after making it into the top 30. She signed with ESteem Models in 2012. She then went on to compete on the fourth season of Korea's Next Top Model in 2013, where, after being eliminated in the third episode and returning in the fifth episode, she placed as a runner-up. She appeared in the music video for Kim Yeon-woo's song "Move" in 2014. She was also featured in spreads for the Korean editions of magazines such as Vogue, Elle, and W before signing with The Society Management and leaving South Korea in 2016 to pursue a career overseas. She also signed to Elite Model Management and Nomad Management. Before moving to New York, Jung inadvertently dyed her hair a "fiery" red color, which became her signature look.

After her booking to walk as an exclusive for Alexander Wang was canceled, she made her international runway debut in September 2016 at Opening Ceremony's S/S 2017 show at New York Fashion Week. Shortly after, she walked in shows for Marc Jacobs, Alberta Ferretti, Chanel, Max Mara, and Fendi; appeared in Harper's Bazaar, Love, and W; and was featured in campaigns for Sephora and Gap. Also in 2016, she made her Paris Fashion Week runway debut as an exclusive model for Louis Vuitton at their S/S 2017 show, selected by Nicolas Ghesquière and casting director Ashley Brokaw. In September 2018, Models.com named Jung on their list of the top 50 models. At the 2019 Asian Model Awards, she won the Asian Star Award.

Jung has walked in runways for Burberry, Miu Miu, Jason Wu, Chanel, Schiaparelli, Giambattista Valli, Bottega Veneta, Emilio Pucci, Prabal Gurung, Jacquemus, Gabriela Hearst, Moschino, Oscar de la Renta, Roberto Cavalli, Jeremy Scott, Tory Burch, Jean-Paul Gaultier, Acne Studios, Brandon Maxwell, Gucci, Lanvin, and Zuhair Murad. She has also appeared in advertisements for Louis Vuitton, Chanel, Hermès, and Bottega Veneta, and on the covers of Vogue Korea, Vogue Japan, CR Fashion Book, and Harper's Bazaar Korea.

Jung appeared in a promotional video for Pharrell and Chanel's collaborative capsule collection in March 2019. In October 2021, she was named Louis Vuitton's Global House Ambassador for fashion, watches, and jewelry. That same month, she partnered with Adidas Originals for their Adicolor campaign. She was featured on the cover of the February 2022 issue of Vogue, making her the magazine's first solo Korean cover star. In 2022, she became one of the faces of N°1 de Chanel. In 2022, Models.com listed Jung on the "New Supers" list, calling her a "supermodel for the modern era."

In 2023, Jung and French singer Aya Nakamura became global brand ambassadors for French luxury beauty brand Lancôme.

Acting
Jung decided to start her career in acting because of the short life span of model careers, which she felt as her work in modeling began to decrease. While modeling overseas, Jung periodically returned to South Korea during holidays to take acting lessons, and took three months' worth of acting lessons altogether. She also improved her English in order to help her learn acting. In January 2020, Jung was signed to Korean talent agency Saram Entertainment. She made her acting debut in the 2021 Netflix K-drama Squid Game in which she played Kang Sae-byeok, a North Korean defector and pickpocket who needs money to support her younger brother and track down her mother in North Korea. One month after signing with Saram, she was given three scenes from the show's script, and auditioned for the role via video while in New York for Fashion Week. She was then asked by director Hwang Dong-hyuk to audition again in person in South Korea, where she was given the part immediately.

She studied for the role of Sae-byeok by practicing her character's Hamgyŏng dialect with real North Korean defectors, watching documentaries about North Korean defectors, and learning martial arts. She also drew upon her own feelings of loneliness while modeling overseas to build the character, and wrote a daily diary from her character's perspective. Sae-byeok became a fan favorite, and Jung was called Squid Games breakout star by critics. For her performance on the show, Jung won the Screen Actors Guild Award for Outstanding Performance by a Female Actor in a Drama Series at the 28th Screen Actors Guild Awards. This nomination made her the second actress of Asian as well as Korean descent to receive an individual SAG Award nomination. Her win, along with costar Lee Jung-jae winning the respective male award, made history for the show becoming the first non-English language television series to win at the SAG Awards. She was also nominated along with her costars for the Screen Actors Guild Award for Outstanding Performance by an Ensemble in a Drama Series.
In November 2021, she signed a contract with Creative Artists Agency, an American talent agency.

Jung was featured in The Weeknd's music video "Out of Time" in 2022. She is set to make her feature film debut with the A24 film The Governesses, directed by Joe Talbot. Jung will also appear in Alfonso Cuarón's thriller series Disclaimer opposite Cate Blanchett.

Public image
While working as a model, Jung became known by designers as the "red-haired Asian". Vogues Monica Kim called her "one of Seoul's top modeling talents" in 2015. In 2021, K-Ci Williams of Vulture called Jung "the world's current 'It' girl." Jung became the most-followed South Korean actress on Instagram in 2021, surpassing actresses Lee Sung-kyung and Song Hye-kyo and, as of August 2022, has over 23 million followers on the platform.

Personal life
Jung has been in a relationship with actor Lee Dong-hwi since 2015. Her net worth is estimated to be US$4 million as of 2021.

Filmography

Film

Television

Web series

Music videos

Awards and nominations

Listicles

Notes

References

External links
  at Saram Entertainment 
 

Living people
1994 births
South Korean female models
People from Seoul
Actresses from Seoul
Models from Seoul
Top Model contestants
The Society Management models
Elite Model Management models
Louis Vuitton exclusive models
21st-century South Korean actresses
Dongduk Women's University alumni